The Kalmar Regiment, designations I 20, I 21 and Fo 18, was a Swedish Army infantry regiment that traced its origins back to the 16th century. It was merged with another unit to form a new regiment in 1928. It was later reraised and disbanded again in 1997. The regiment's soldiers were originally recruited from Kalmar County, and it was later garrisoned there.

History 
The regiment has its origins in fänikor (companies) raised in Kalmar County in the 16th century. In 1616, these units—along with fänikor from the nearby Kronoberg County—were organised by Gustav II Adolf into Smålands storregemente, of which twelve of the total 24 companies were recruited in Kalmar County. Smålands storregemente consisted of three field regiments, of which Kalmar Regiment was one. Sometime around 1623, the grand regiment was permanently split into three smaller regiments, of which Kalmar Regiment was one.

Kalmar Regiment was one of the original 20 Swedish infantry regiments mentioned in the Swedish constitution of 1634. The regiment's first commander was Patrick Ruthwen. The regiment was allotted in 1686. The regiment was given the designation I 20 (20th Infantry Regiment) in a general order in 1816. The designation was changed to I 21 in 1892.

The regiment was garrisoned in Eksjö from 1906, before it was merged with Jönköping Regiment to form Jönköping-Kalmar Regiment in 1927. Kalmar Regiment was reorganised in 1994 as a local defence district with the designation Fo 18, although disbanded again just three years later in 1997.

Campaigns 
The Northern Seven Years' War (1563–1570)
The Livonian War (1570–1582)
The Polish War (1600–1629)
The Thirty Years' War (1630–1648)
The Northern Wars (1655–1661)
The Scanian War (1674–1679)
The Great Northern War (1700–1721)
The Hats' Russian War (1741–1743)
The Seven Years' War (1757–1762)
The Gustav III's Russian War (1788–1790)
The Franco-Swedish War (1805–1810)
The Finnish War (1808–1809)
The War of the Sixth Coalition (1813–1814)
The Campaign against Norway (1814)

Organisation 

1686(?)
Livkompaniet
Överstelöjtnantens kompani
Majorens kompani
Östra Härads kompani
Uppvidinge kompani
Västra Härads kompani
Aspolands härads kompani
Konga härads kompani

18??
Livkompaniet
Vedbo kompani
Aspelands kompani
Östra Härads kompani
Seveds kompani
Uppvidinge kompani
Västra Härads kompani
Konga kompani

Heraldry and traditions

Colours, standards and guidons

The regiment has carried a number of colours over the years. On 24 June 1866, major general P E Lovén presented a new colour to the two battalions of the regiment, which then replaced the previous colours. The colours were used until the disbandment of the regiment, and were carried by Jönköping-Kalmar Regiment (I 12) from 1928 to 1954. When Kalmar Regiment was re-raised in the form of a defense district staff, the regiment was assigned a new colour. The new Kalmar Regiment adopted the same colour as the Kalmar Regiment which was disbanded in 1927. However, the regiment did not inherit the 1866 colour, but was presented with a new colour model 1994. The colour was presented in Kalmar by the Chief of the Army, lieutenant general Åke Sagrén on 10 October 1992. It was used as regimental colour by Fo 18 until 15 December 1997. The colour is drawn by Bengt Olof Kälde and embroidered by machine and hand in insertion technique by Gunilla Hjort. Blazon: "On red cloth in the centre on a circular yellow shield the provincial badge of Smaland; a red lion rampant, armed blue, in the forepaws a red crossbow with a white arrow and black bow, string and trigger. On a yellow border at the upper side of the colour, battle honours (Varberg 1565, Narva 1581, Warszawa 1656, Tåget över Bält 1658, Kliszow 1702, Helsingborg 1710, Svensksund 1790) in red."

Coat of arms
The coat of the arms of the Kalmar Regiment (Fo 18) 1994–1997 and the Kalmar Group (Kalmargruppen) 1997–2004. Blazon: "Quarterly: I and IV or, the provincial badge of Småland, a double-tailed lion rampant gules, armed and langued azure, in the forepaws a cross-bow gules, arrow-head argent, bow and
string sable. II and III azure, the provincial badge of Öland, a stag passant or, gorged with a necklace and armed, both gules. The shield surmounted two muskets in saltire or".

Medals
In 1997, the Kalmar regementes (Fo 18) minnesmedalj ("Kalmar Regiment (Fo 18) Commemorative Medal") in silver (KalmregSMM) of the 8th size was established. The medal ribbon is divided in red, yellow, red, yellow and red moiré.

Heritage
In connection with the disbandment of Kalmar Regiment through the Defence Act of 1996, its traditions was continued from 1 December 1998 onwards by Kalmar Group (Kalmargruppen). From 1 July 2013, the Kalmar Battalion, within Kalmar and Kronoberg Group (Kalmar- och Kronobergsgruppen), is the traditional keeper of Kalmar Regiment.

Other
The original regiment had "Kalmar regementets marsch" (Meissner) and "Kaiser Friedrich-Marsch" (Friedemann) as their marches. The new Kalmar Regiment adopted the march "Kalmarbrigaden" (Badman), originally awarded to the Kalmar Brigade (IB 42).

Commanding officers
Regimental commander active at the regiment during the years 1623–1927 and 1994–1997.

1623–16??: Patrick Ruthven
1630–1639: David Drummund
1639–1645: Thure Bremer
1645–1656: Alexander Irving
1656–1662: Gustaf Kruse
1662–1674: Barthold
1674–1677: Henrik Wulfvenkhu
1677–1686: Erik Soop
1686–1698: Hans v. Dellinghausen
1698–1699: Magnus Stenbock
1699–1700: Nils Djurklou
1700–1701: N Djurklow
1701–1709: G Ranck 
1709–1716: C Björnberg
1716–1730: S Sture , 
1730–1733: G Zülich
1733–1734: F C Marschalk
1734–1736: L von Muners
1736–1739: C de Frumerie
1739–1740: A J Giertta
1740–1747: L Fahlström
1747–1757: C G von Roxendorff
1757–1757: N Djurlkou
1757–1770: E G Lillienberg
1770–1772: E Armfelt (never took position)
1772–1778: A W von Baltzar
1778–1779: F Posse
1779–1795: A D Schönström
1795–1802: C Mörner
1802–1804: A L von Frisendorff
1804–1816: J H Tavast
1812–1813: M F F Björnstjerna (acting)
1813–1814: C M Klingström (acting)
1816–1826: E G Ulfsparre
1826–1832: C M Klingström
1832–1847: C J Hederstierna
1847–1853: G E A Taube
1853–1859: G G H Stierngranat
1859–1865: F M L Dandenell
1865–1877: E O Weidenhielm
1871–1877: P S W Björkman (acting)
1877–1888: P S W Björkman
1888–1894: O G Nordenskjöld
1894–1895: H F Gyllenram
1895–1902: Fredrik Kugelberg
1902–1910: Carl Gustaf Knut Eklundh
1910–1914: Carl Adam Constans Stålhammar
1914–1926: Sam Gustaf Laurentius Myhrman
1926–1927: Natanael Wikander
1990–1994: Birger Jägtoft
1994–1995: Birger Jägtoft
1995–1997: Dan Albin Snell

Names, designations and locations

See also
List of Swedish infantry regiments

Footnotes

References

Notes

Print

Further reading

Infantry regiments of the Swedish Army
Disbanded units and formations of Sweden
Military units and formations established in 1626
Military units and formations disestablished in 1709
Military units and formations established in 1709
Military units and formations disestablished in 1927
Military units and formations established in 1994
Military units and formations disestablished in 1997
1626 establishments in Sweden
1927 disestablishments in Sweden
1994 establishments in Sweden
1997 disestablishments in Sweden
Eksjö Garrison